Hinojosa del Duque is a city located in the province of Córdoba, Spain. According to the 2014 census, the municipality has a population of 7126 inhabitants.

Twin towns
 Cerdanyola del Vallès, Spain
 İslahiye, Turkey

See also
Battle of Valsequillo

References

External links

Hinojosa del Duque - Sistema de Información Multiterritorial de Andalucía

Municipalities in the Province of Córdoba (Spain)